Francesco Squarcione (c. 1395 – after 1468) was an Italian artist from Padua. His pupils included Andrea Mantegna (with whom he had many legal battles), Cosimo Tura and Carlo Crivelli. There are only two works signed by him: the Madonna and Child (now in Berlin) and the Lazara Altarpiece (now in Padua).

Biography
Squarcione, whose original vocation was tailoring, appears to have had a remarkable enthusiasm for ancient art, and a faculty for acting. Squarcione was interested in ancient Rome; he travelled in Italy, and perhaps Greece, collecting antique statues, reliefs, vases, and other works of art, forming a collection of such works, making drawings from them himself, and throwing open his stores for others to study from.  Based on this collection, he undertook works on commission for which his pupils no less than himself were made available. As many as 137 painters and pictorial students passed through his school, established in 1431 and which became famous all over Italy. Squarcione's favorite pupil was Mantegna. Squarcione taught Mantegna the Latin language and instructed him to study fragments of Roman sculpture.

Squarcione's Polyptych of Lazarus, originally in the Carmine church in Padua, is not on display in the Museo Civici di Padua at the former Eremitani monastery.

Pupils or followers of Squarcione include Francesco Verla, Pietro Calzetta, and Andrea Bellunello.

References

1390s births
1468 deaths
Painters from Padua
15th-century Italian painters
Italian male painters
Italian antiquarians